is a Japanese actor and model. He debuted as a model in Men's Non-no magazine in 2010, and as an actor under Tristone Entertainment in 2014. He has since starred in television series Tokyo Tarareba Musume (2017) and Signal (2018), as well as films The 100th Love with You (2017) and Color Me True (2018).

Career

Modelling
Sakaguchi debuted as a model in 2010, and has since appeared in cover stories and pictorials for several magazines including Men's Non-no for which he was an exclusive model for 7 years. He has also participated in fashion shows like GirlsAward 2014 Spring/Summer and GirlsAward 2015 Spring/Summer.

He has been called the quintessential "shio-gao," literally salt-face, which is described as a fair-skinned male with good-looking face, defined Adam's apple and collarbones, as well eyes that turn into lines when smiling.

Acting
In 2014, Sakaguchi made his film debut as Shun in Shanti Days 365 Days, Happy Breath. In 2015, he made his television debut as Ichikawa Manabu for the Nippon TV drama Yokokuhan: The Pain. In August 2015, he appeared in the music video for "Yozora", a single by Miwa. In September that year, he gained popularity after appearing in the film adaptation of the manga Heroine Shikkaku and was featured in a variety of advertisements for L'air de Savon, Onitsuka Tiger, and niko and.... In 2017, he played his first leading role in the film The 100th Love with You.

Filmography

Film

Television

Music videos

Theater

Bibliography

Mook
Sakamichi (Shueisha Mook, November 2015)

Photobook
25.6 (Shueisha, March 2018)

Awards and nominations

References

External links

 
 
 
 Tristone Entertainment
 Men's Non-No

Japanese male models
Japanese male film actors
Japanese male television actors
Male actors from Tokyo
1991 births
Living people
Models from Tokyo Metropolis